"Monster" is the second single from the 2009 album Awake by the American Christian rock band Skillet, and is the second track on the album. The single went on to become the band's breakthrough single, charting at No. 4 on the U.S. Billboard Mainstream Rock Tracks chart and No. 1 on the Billboard Bubbling Under Hot 100 chart. A radio edit of the song can be found on the deluxe version of the album Awake which doesn’t include the growling section of the song. It is also the fifth single by Skillet to be released to physical media.

Reception 

The single peaked No. 1 on Christian Rock radio, No. 2 on Christian Hard Rock radio, No. 20 on the Billboard Rock Songs chart, No. 7 on the Top Heatseekers, No. 4 on the US Active rock charts, and number No. 4 on the Mainstream rock charts, making it the most successful single in the band's history. It is also the first single to make the Alternative Songs chart, debuting at No. 40, peaked at No. 28. On November 10, it was announced that the song had reached the "Elite 8" on MTV's rotation slot. The song was also the tenth-most played Halloween song of 2010.

Promotion 

In the first week of April 2010, "Monster" was released as downloadable content for Rock Band 2.

Music video 

The music video for "Monster" was directed by the Erwin brothers, and was released on September 2nd, 2009 on Noisecreep. It features the band performing in a hospital room while in the next room, lead vocalist and bassist, John Cooper and guitarist, Korey Cooper, are being tested on and under observation from a medical team. The video cuts back to both Korey and John who wake up in different parts of the hospital while undergoing various tests. Eventually both escape while being chased by SWAT teams. The video ends with a dub over of a man reporting that there has been a "containment breach", and John and Korey walking out of the hospital into the sunlight. Guitarist Ben Kasica and drummer Jen Ledger both appear as doctors in the beginning of the video. Skillet released a making-of for the video in one of their podcasts. The video was featured on Fuse's number one countdown: Viewer's Choice at No. 1.

Awards 

The song was nominated for "Short Form Video of the Year" at the 41st GMA Dove Awards.

Credits 
 John Cooper – lead vocals, bass
 Korey Cooper – guitar, keyboard
 Ben Kasica – lead guitar
 Jen Ledger – drums

Accolades

Charts

Compilation appearances 

It was included on the soundtrack for WWE SmackDown vs. Raw 2010.

Certifications

References

External links 
 

2009 singles
Skillet (band) songs
Songs written by John Cooper (musician)
Song recordings produced by Howard Benson
Atlantic Records singles
2009 songs
Lava Records singles
Ardent Records singles